Lillie Claus-Dostal (1905–2000) was an Austrian lyric coloratura opera and operetta singer.

Biography
She received  a musical education in her youth (vocals, piano, dance school).  When she was 16 she entered the Vienna Academy of Music.  She debuted as Papagena in Mozart's The Magic Flute at the Vienna State Opera.

After engagements at several theatres, she returned to the Vienna State Opera.  There, she heard the composer Nico Dostal was in search a leading singer for his operetta "Clivia".  On 23 December 1933, she took part in the premiere in the Berlin theatre on Nollendorfplatz.

On 30 November 1934, she sang the 'Lied der Lulu' (part of the five-movement concert suite version of Alban Berg's opera Lulu) at the Berlin Staatsoper Unter den Linden under Erich Kleiber.

In the ensuing period Lillie Claus focused increasingly on operetta. Nico Dostal wrote several of his operettas for her voice.

1933 Clivia (opera)
1935 Die Vielgeliebte ( "I am in love")
1936 Prinzessin Nofretete
1937 Extra leaves ( "I forgot my heart away")
1937 Monika ( "Home Song")
1939 Die ungarische Hochzeit ( "I play the song of happiness and litter")

In 1942 she married Nico Dostal and retired from the stage.  Their son  Roman Dostal, later to be a conductor, was born in 1943 and the family lived in Salzburg. At Nico Dostal's 100th birthday celebration in 1995, the 90-year-old Lillie Claus Dostal was still in the best of health and participated in the events. She made several records.

Selected filmography
 The Swedish Nightingale (1941)

Recordings
Eine Grande Dame der Operette: Lillie Claus. Songs from operettas and films. Recordings between 1932 and 1941. Rv-Musik RV2618 CD.

References

External links 
 

1905 births
2000 deaths
Austrian operatic sopranos
Musicians from Vienna
20th-century Austrian women opera singers
University of Music and Performing Arts Vienna alumni